Deuteronomy is the fifth book of the Christian Old Testament and of the Jewish Torah.

Deuteronomy may also refer to:
Dewey Duck, full name Deuteronomy Duck in Quack Pack
Deuteronomy (band), an American psychedelic power pop band
Old Deuteronomy, a character in T. S. Eliot's Old Possum's Book of Practical Cats

See also
Deuteronomium (disambiguation)